The city of Colorado Springs, the second-largest city in Colorado and the county seat of El Paso County, Colorado, United States, has been the birthplace and home of several notable individuals. This list of people from Colorado Springs includes people that were born or lived in the city or greater metropolitan area. Individuals included in this list are people presumed to be notable because they have received significant coverage in reliable sources that are independent of the subject.

Agriculture

 Nick Venetucci (1911–2004), philanthropist who donated over 1 million pumpkins to children

Arts and entertainment

Art
 Charles Ragland Bunnell (1897–1968)
 Starr Kempf (1917–1995), sculptor
 Maxfield Parrish (1870–1966), painter; worked and studied in Colorado Springs
 Charles M. Schulz (1922–2000), creator of Peanuts cartoon strip; lived in Colorado Springs in the 1950s
 Artus Van Briggle (1869-1904), Art Nouveau potter
 Elizabeth Wright Ingraham (1922–2013), architect

Literature and poetry
 Robert A. Heinlein, science-fiction author
 Helen Hunt Jackson, author
 Stanley Krueber, pulp fiction author; buried in Colorado Springs
 Beverly Lewis, novelist, known for her stories of Amish life
 Michelle Malkin, conservative author, commentator and blogger, moved to Colorado Springs in 2008
 Michael A. O'Donnell, award-winning author, Ph.D
 Leonard Peikoff, philosopher and heir to Ayn Rand estate
 John E. Stith, science-fiction and mystery author, has lived here since 1970s

Modeling
 Leeann Tweeden, model, worked briefly as a waitress at a local Hooters in 1991–92
 Paul Vandervort, model, was with the Janice Dickinson Modelling Agency, is from Colorado Springs

Music and comedy
 Lewis Black, comedian, lived briefly in Colorado Springs with college friends as part-owner of a small theater
 Black Pegasus, hip hop and rap artist, songwriter, label owner, and entertainment company owner
 Zach Filkins, lead guitarist of OneRepublic
 Tom Hamilton, Aerosmith bassist, born in Colorado Springs
 Jag Panzer, power metal band
 Keith Lockhart, former conductor of Pikes Peak Symphony, current conductor of Boston Pops
 Max Morath, born in Colorado Springs
 Günther Johannes Paetsch, co-founder of the Paetsch Family Chamber Music Ensemble in Colorado Springs, Colorado
 Johann Sebastian Paetsch, cellist, born and raised in Colorado Springs
 The Procussions, hip hop group originating from Colorado Springs; original lineup included Mr. J. Medeiros, Stro Elliot, Rez, Vice Versa, and Q; group now consists of Mr. J. Medeiros and Stro Elliot
 Johnny Smith, jazz guitarist
 Ryan Tedder, lead singer of OneRepublic
 Laura Veirs, singer
 OneRepublic, pop-rock band
 YTCracker, pioneering nerdcore artist and former computer hacker

Television, theater, and film
 Juli Ashton, actress
 Kelly Bishop, actress
 Michael Boatman, actor
 Spring Byington, actress
 Lon Chaney (1883-1930), silent film star; born in Colorado Springs; Lon Chaney Theatre is named for him
 Duane Chapman, from Dog the Bounty Hunter
 Marceline Day, actress
 Chris Fowler, sportscaster and ESPN College GameDay football host
 Dustin Hodge, television writer and producer, worked for KKTV
 Clinton Jencks, actor and activist 
 Norman Kean, Broadway producer; born in Colorado Springs
 Joe Kenda, former Colorado Springs Police Department detective featured on Investigation Discovery television show Homicide Hunter
 Chase Masterson, actress
 Cassandra Peterson (also known as Elvira, Mistress of the Dark), graduated in 1969 from General William J. Palmer High School in Colorado Springs
 Sydney Pollack, actor and Academy Award-winning director, worked downtown during a stint at Fort Carson
 Chris Sanders, filmmaker, illustrator, and voice actor
 Hillary Wolf, actress and Olympian, currently lives in Colorado Springs
 Stephen Thomas Ochsner, actor, director, musician, artist, translator, and producer

Video game designers
 John Romero

Politics
 George M. Borg, member of the Wisconsin State Senate and Wisconsin State Assembly
 John Dingell, U.S. Representative 
 Henry W. Hoagland, American political activist
 Scott Walker, Governor of Wisconsin (2011–2019)

Religion
 James Dobson, Focus on the Family founder
 Ted Haggard, New Life Church founder
 Rev. Michael A. O'Donnell, Ph.D., former Priest-in-Charge of Grace and St. Stephen's Episcopal Church
 Elizabeth Clare Prophet, founder of Church Universal and Triumphant, and her husband Mark L. Prophet operated The Summit Lighthouse in the Broadmoor neighborhood, 1966–1976
 Mark L. Prophet, with wife Elizabeth Clare Prophet, operated The Summit Lighthouse in the Broadmoor neighborhood, 1966–1976
 Dawson Trotman, founder of parachurch Christian organization The Navigators

Science, technology and industry
 Albert E. Carlton, investor in Colorado banks, mines and railroads.
 Seymour Cray, founder of Cray Research, lived in Colorado Springs; killed in an automobile accident in northern Colorado Springs
 J.J. Hagerman, mining and railroad industrialist, expanded the Colorado Midland Railway while living in Colorado Springs
 Myra Keen, malacologist
 Ancel Keys, physiologist, born in Colorado Springs
 Warren P. Mason, electrical engineer and physicist, born in Colorado Springs
 Mary Jane (Merten) Osborn, microbiologist and biochemist, born in Colorado Springs  
 William Jackson Palmer, a founder of the city and developer of the Denver & Rio Grande Railroad
 Talcott Parsons, American sociologist
 Kenneth Sims, geologist, born in Colorado Springs
 Winfield Scott Stratton, prospector and philanthropist 
 Nikola Tesla, physicist, lived in Colorado Springs
 Charles L. Tutt Sr., mine owner, ore miller and philanthropist

Astronauts
 James Dutton, lives in Colorado  Springs
 James Irwin, lived in Colorado Springs
 Dorothy Metcalf-Lindenburger, born in Colorado Springs

Sports

Baseball
 Dave Dravecky, pitcher
 Goose Gossage (born 1951), Hall of Fame pitcher; born in Colorado Springs; graduated from Wasson High School; currently lives in Colorado Springs
 Brandon McCarthy, MLB starting pitcher of the Atlanta Braves; attended high school in Colorado Springs

Basketball
 Lynn Barry, basketball player and USA Basketball executive, lives in Colorado Springs
 Rick Barry, NBA Hall of Famer; lives in Colorado Springs
 Reggie Jackson, NBA player, Detroit Pistons; attended Palmer High School
 Danielle Page, Olympic bronze medalist; European champion as part of the Serbian women's national team

Combat sports
 Henry Cejudo,  Olympic gold medalist; graduated from Coronado High School in Colorado Springs
 Donald Cerrone, UFC fighter; attended Air Academy High School
 Benson Henderson, mixed martial artist; born in Colorado Springs
 Bobby Lashley, WWE wrestler; is billed from Colorado Springs
 Bob "The Beast" Sapp, kickboxer, wrestler and actor; born in Colorado Springs and attended Mitchell High School
 Michelle Waterson, mixed martial artist; born in Colorado Springs

Figure skating

 Max Aaron (born 1992), 2013 U.S. national champion figure skater
John Coughlin (1985-2019), figure skater, committed suicide
 Alexa Knierim and Chris Knierim, Olympic figure skaters, 2018 Olympic bronze medalists, 2015 and 2018 U.S. national champions
 Jill Trenary, figure skater; trained and lived in Colorado Springs

Football
 Roc Alexander, NFL cornerback 
 Cullen Bryant, NFL running back for the Los Angeles Rams; graduated from William (Billy) Mitchell High School
 Earl "Dutch" Clark, football player; graduated from Colorado College
 Jack Evans, NFL quarterback for the Green Bay Packers
 Barry Helton, NFL punter for the San Francisco 49ers
 Lamarr Houston, NFL defensive end for the Chicago Bears; graduated from Doherty High School
 Vincent Jackson, NFL wide receiver for the Tampa Bay Buccaneers; graduated from Widefield High School
 Steve Sabol, NFL Films co-founder; attended Colorado College near downtown Colorado Springs
 Matt Slauson, NFL offensive lineman; graduated from Air Academy High School
 Aaron Smith, NFL defensive end for the Pittsburgh Steelers

Ice hockey
 Brandon Carlo, professional hockey player
 David Hale, professional hockey player; born in Colorado Springs
 Jim Johannson, ice hockey player, coach and USA Hockey executive
 Dave Peterson, coach of the United States men's national ice hockey team and USA Hockey executive

Soccer
 James Riley, born in Colorado Springs

Other sports and competitive events
 Christopher Dean, British former Olympic ice dancer, 1984 Olympic Champion, 1994 Olympic bronze medalist
 Robert Griswold (born 1996), swimmer
 Steve O'Dwyer, professional poker player
 Arlene Pieper, first woman to complete a U.S. marathon
 Bill Roy, former Olympian and world champion skeet shooter
Keith Sanderson (born 1975), sport shooter
 Susan Beth Scott, Paralympic swimmer, bronze medalist in London 2012 and Beijing 2008 Paralympic Games
 Bobby Unser, automobile racer, born in Colorado Springs

See also
 List of people from Colorado

References

Colorado Springs, Colorado
 
Colorado Springs